Sky Hooks is a painted sheet steel sculpture by Alexander Calder, constructed in 1962. It is located at the Hirshhorn Museum and Sculpture Garden.

See also
 List of public art in Washington, D.C., Ward 2

References

External links
Virtual Globe Trotting: Sky Hooks by Calder
Waymarking
Sky-Hooks
Sky-Hooks in snow

Sculptures by Alexander Calder
Hirshhorn Museum and Sculpture Garden
Sculptures of the Smithsonian Institution
1962 sculptures
Abstract sculptures in Washington, D.C.
Outdoor sculptures in Washington, D.C.
Steel sculptures in Washington, D.C.